Eden Batit (born 14 September 1990) is an Israeli football forward who currently plays for F.C. Ashdod.

External links
 

1990 births
Living people
Israeli footballers
Association football midfielders
F.C. Ashdod players
Hakoah Maccabi Amidar Ramat Gan F.C. players
Maccabi Yavne F.C. players
Hapoel Acre F.C. players
Hapoel Ramat Gan F.C. players
Israeli Premier League players
Liga Leumit players
Footballers from Ashdod
Israeli people of Moroccan-Jewish descent